Carters Ridge is a rural locality in the Gympie Region, Queensland, Australia.

Geography
The Mary River forms the western boundary.

The land use is an equal mixture of rural residential and grazing on a mixture of native vegetation and irrigated pastures.

History
Carter's Ridge Provisional School opened in May 1925. In 1930, it became Carter's Ridge State School. It closed in 1967. It was at 894 Kenilworth Skyring Creek Road.

Education 
There are no schools in Carters Ridge. The nearest government primary schools are Federal State School in Federal to the north and Cooroy State School in Cooroy to the north-east. The nearest government secondary schools are Mary Valley State College (to Year 10 only) in Imbil to the west and  Noosa District State High School, which has its Years 7 & 8 campus in Pomona and its Years 9 to 12 campus in Cooroy.

Amenities 
Mary Fereday Park is in Poulsen Road.

References 

Gympie Region
Localities in Queensland